Sint-Jozef is a quarter in Bruges, which is the capital of the Flemish province of West Flanders, in Belgium.

External links
Website Bruges
Parochie Sint-Jozef (in Dutch)
Scouting Sint-Jozef (in Dutch)

Populated places in West Flanders
Geography of Bruges